Bryan Josué Bernárdez Barrios (born 24 May 1994) is a Honduran footballer who plays as a centre-back or right-back for C.D.S. Vida.

Club career
On 30 June 2020, Spanish Segunda División B side Real Balompédica Linense announced the signing of Barrios on a free transfer after his contract with C.D. Marathón expired. He signed a one-year contract with an option for an additional year depending on performances.

On 23 January 2021, Barrios terminated his contract with Linense, due to personal problems according to Spanish media. Barrios returned to his native Honduras and signed with C.D.S. Vida the following 1 February.

References

External links
 

1996 births
Living people
Association football defenders
Honduran footballers
C.D. Marathón players
Parrillas One players
Real Balompédica Linense footballers
C.D.S. Vida players
Liga Nacional de Fútbol Profesional de Honduras players
Segunda División B players
Honduras international footballers
Honduran expatriate footballers
Expatriate footballers in Spain
Honduran expatriate sportspeople in Spain
People from San Pedro Sula